The Buffalo Township Public Library, now the Polo Public Library, is a library listed on the National Register of Historic Places in the Ogle County, Illinois city of Polo. The library joined the Register in March 1995.

Architecture
The brick Buffalo Township Public Library sits atop a limestone foundation and features a ceramic tile roof. The library was constructed between 1903 and 1904 and was built by the firm of Greig & Baum. The Classical Revival building was designed by the architectural firm of Patton and Smith. Patton and Miller designed over 100 Carnegie libraries nationwide, including 15 in Illinois.

Significance
The Buffalo Township Public Library was listed on the National Register of Historic Places on November 7, 1995 for its significance in the area of education.

Notes

External links
 Polo Public Library

Library buildings completed in 1904
National Register of Historic Places in Ogle County, Illinois
Polo, Illinois
Carnegie libraries in Illinois
Education in Ogle County, Illinois
Libraries on the National Register of Historic Places in Illinois